László Bálint (born 1 February 1948, in Budapest) is a former Hungarian footballer.

During his club career he played for Ferencvárosi TC, Club Brugge K.V., Toulouse FC and Grenoble Foot 38. He earned 76 caps and scored 3 goals for the Hungary national football team from 1972 to 1982, and participated in UEFA Euro 1972, the 1978 FIFA World Cup, and the 1982 FIFA World Cup. He also won a silver medal in football at the 1972 Summer Olympics.

Later he served as the coach of the national team in 1988.

As a player, he was nicknamed "Báró" (The Baron) because of his elegant appearance. He is a graduate of the Budapest University of Economics.

References
 Profile
 Hungary – Record International Players
 
 

1948 births
Living people
Footballers from Budapest
Hungarian footballers
Hungarian expatriate footballers
Association football defenders
Hungary international footballers
UEFA Euro 1972 players
1978 FIFA World Cup players
1982 FIFA World Cup players
Ferencvárosi TC footballers
Expatriate footballers in Belgium
Belgian Pro League players
Hungarian expatriate sportspeople in Belgium
Club Brugge KV players
Expatriate footballers in France
Ligue 1 players
Toulouse FC players
Hungarian expatriate sportspeople in France
Ligue 2 players
Grenoble Foot 38 players
Olympic footballers of Hungary
Footballers at the 1972 Summer Olympics
Olympic silver medalists for Hungary
Hungarian football managers
Rákospalotai EAC managers
Hungary national football team managers
Olympic medalists in football
Medalists at the 1972 Summer Olympics